Jan Šisler (born 24 April 1988) is a Czech footballer who plays as a midfielder for Karvina, on loan from Mladá Boleslav.

References
 
 

1988 births
Living people
Czech footballers
Czech First League players
FK Jablonec players
FK Čáslav players
FC Hradec Králové players
FK Mladá Boleslav players
FC Zbrojovka Brno players
Association football midfielders